Tibor Tenke (born 13 January 1953) is a Hungarian sailor. He competed in the Star event at the 1992 Summer Olympics.

References

External links
 

1953 births
Living people
Hungarian male sailors (sport)
Olympic sailors of Hungary
Sailors at the 1992 Summer Olympics – Star
Sportspeople from Budapest